Erk is a village in Heves County, Northern Hungary Region, Hungary.

Sights to visit
  The catholic church
  Wind Farm

See also
 List of populated places in Hungary

References

External links
 

Populated places in Heves County